Etheostoma nebra is a species of freshwater ray-finned fish, a darter from the subfamily Etheostomatinae, part of the family Percidae, which also contains the perches, ruffes and pikeperches. It is endemic to the eastern United States, where it is restricted to the Buck Creek system of the Cumberland River drainage in Kentucky. This species is likely to be critically imperiled due to its restricted geographic range and the loss of populations within the Buck Creek system since the 1980s.

References

nebra
Fish described in 2015